Bammatyurt (Yokqa-Bamt-Yurt) is a rural locality (a selo) in Khasavyurtovsky District, Republic of Dagestan, Russia. The population was 4,337 as of 2010. There are 31 streets.

Geography 
Bammatyurt is located 14 km north of Khasavyurt (the district's administrative centre) by road. Kandauraul is the nearest rural locality.

References 

Rural localities in Khasavyurtovsky District